William Atherton (born 1947) is an American actor.

William Atherton may also refer to:

William Atherton (mayor of Preston), (c.1705–1745)
William Atherton (minister) (1775–1850), Wesleyan minister
William Atherton (politician) (1806–1864), Scottish barrister and politician
William Atherton (plantation owner)
William Atherton (soldier), Kentucky rifleman and veteran of the War of 1812
William H. Atherton (1867–1950), Canadian writer, historian, academic and scholar